Congregation Kol Emes ( ("Kol Emes" means "voice [of] truth" in Hebrew) also known as Young Israel of Richmond is an Orthodox Jewish synagogue in Richmond, Virginia, constituted and founded in its present state in 1964. 

It is one of the oldest active Jewish congregations in Virginia, the fourth oldest active congregation in Richmond, and housing the oldest active mikvah in Richmond. It is a member synagogue of the National Council of Young Israel and the Orthodox Union.

It is a very small congregation, compared to the larger and more successful congregations in the city, such as Keneseth Beth Israel.

History
Congregation Kol Emes is a continuation of Orthodox synagogues in Richmond dating back to 1789. It has been at the center of the continuation of Orthodox Jewish life in Richmond:

In 1964... brothers Abraham and Emil Dere spearheaded the founding of the Jewish Academy of Richmond, which, shortly thereafter became Congregation Kol Emes, with the guidance of HaRav Nachman Bulman, who at the time was a Rov in Newport News, VA. At the time, once again, Kol Emes housed the only Mikvah in Richmond (until the Chabad Mikvah opened in the 1980s) and the only shul in Richmond with a Mechitzah (until Keneseth Beth Israel moved to its present location in the 1970s). In 1965, the Richmond Hebrew Day School, presently Rudlin Torah Academy, was founded in the Kol Emes building, with personal blessings from Gedolei Yisrael.

See also
American Jews
History of the Jews in the United States
Richmond Jewish Foundation
Virginia Holocaust Museum

References and notes

External links
Newer website of Young Israel of Richmond / Congregation Kol Emes for fundraising and outreach
Current website of the congregation as Kol Emes of Richmond
Synagogue's site on Yahoo!

National Council of Young Israel
Synagogues in Richmond, Virginia
Jewish organizations established in 1964
Orthodox synagogues in the United States
Modern Orthodox synagogues in the United States
Culture of Richmond, Virginia
Buildings and structures in Richmond, Virginia